Ivara Ejemot Esu OFR, (born 3 May 1951) is a Nigerian politician, academic administrator and professor who is the current Deputy Governor of Cross River State. He hails from Agwagune in Biase Local Government Area of Cross River State, Nigeria. He holds the Nigerian National Honours Award in the rank of Officer of the Order of the Federal Republic (OFR) Conferred on him by President Obasanjo in 2005 and the Cross River State Honours Merit Award Conferred on him by Governor Donald Duke in 2004 for carrying out excellent management reforms at the University of Calabar. Esu has held many positions of responsibility such as Vice Chancellor, University of Calabar (2000–2005); Honourable Minister of State for Tourism, Culture and National Orientation (Jan–May 2007); Member, Technical Committee on Privatization and Commercialization (TCPC), Presidency, Lagos (1990–1992); Honourable Commissioner for Agriculture, Water Resources and Rural Development Cross River State (1992–1993); Chairman Federal Medical Centre Board, Owerri (2009–2011) and chairman, Nnamdi Azikiwe University  Teaching Hospital, Nnewi (2012–2015) and was an Elder Statesman Delegate at the 2014 National Conference of Nigeria.
Esu is a Soil Scientist (Pedologist) who has taught in various tertiary institutions, some of which include; the Kaduna Polytechnic; Ahmadu Bello University Zaria, University of Calabar, University of Uyo and the University of Ghana, Legon, Accra.

Early life 
Ivara Ejemot Esu was born into the family of Jonathan and Ada Ejemot Esu at Agwagune, in Biase Local Government Area of Cross River State. His father was a businessman, whose encouragement motivated him to get to the peak of his educational career. Ivara Esu received his primary education at Presbyterian Primary School Itigidi, Abi Local Government Area in Cross River State between 1957 and 1963. He attended Presbyterian Secondary School, Abakaliki, Ebonyi state from 1964 to 1967, Community Secondary Grammar School, Ugep, Yakurr Local Government Area from 1968 to 1969 and Mary Knoll College, Okuku, Yala Local Government Area from January–September 1970. He studied for his undergraduate degree at the University of Ife, now referred to as Obafemi Awolowo University, Ile Ife between 1970 and 1974 where he obtained a second-class honours, (upper division) in Agriculture. Between 1971 and 1974, he won and studied with the German Academic Exchange Scholarship reserved for the Best performing students in faculties. He also attended the University of Minnesota, St. Paul Campus USA between 1976 and 1978 where he obtained an MSc in Soil Science. In 1982, he went ahead to obtain a PhD in Pedology from the Ahmadu Bello University, Zaria.

Career 
Esu started his career in 1975 as an Assistant Lecturer in Soil Science at the Kaduna Polytechnic, Kaduna State and progressed steadily to the rank of a professor of Pedology in 1994, at the age of 43. During these years, he taught at the Kaduna Polytechnic, National Institute of Water Resources, Kaduna, Ahmadu Bello University, Zaria, University of Calabar, University of Ghana (visiting scholar) and the University of Uyo where he was an adjunct professor. He also served as Dean of Agriculture, Provost of Okuku Campus, Deputy Vice Chancellor (Academic) and later became the Vice Chancellor, all at the University of Calabar. He taught Pedology, Soil Survey and Land Use Planning, to different groups of students and has supervised several BSc, MSc and PhD dissertations and theses in his over 30 years teaching and research career.

Personal life
Esu is married to Omotunde Abosede Ivara Esu, a permanent secretary in the Cross River State Government and they have four children; Ekpereonne, Ozak, Orimini and Onyi.

List of Selected Publications

Theses and Books
ESU, I. E. 1974. A semi-quantitative study of the mineralogy of some selected soils of Nigeria. BSc Final Year Project, University of Ife, Ile-Ife, Nigeria. 38 pp.
ESU, I. E. 1978. Productivity of tree species as related to soil mapping units in northern Minnesota. MSc Thesis, University of Minnesota, St. Paul U.S.A 138 pp.
ESU, I. E. 1982. Evaluation of soils for irrigation in the Kaduna area of Nigeria. PhD Thesis, Ahmadu Bello University, Zaria, Nigeria. 305 pp.
ESU, I. E. 1999. Fundamentals of Pedology. Stirling-Horden Publishers (Nig.) Ltd., Ibadan 136 pp (Launched in Calabar on 2 Sept. 1999).
ESU, I. E. 2005. Characterization, Classification and Management Problems of the Major Soil Orders in Nigeria. 26th Inaugural Lecture of the University of Calabar delivered on 26 April 2005. 66 pp.
ESU, I. E. 2010. Soil Characterization Classification and Survey. Heinneman Book Publishers Nigeria. 252 pp.

Journal Papers Published
ESU, I. E.  and D.F GRIGAL, 1979. "Productivity of quaking aspen (Populus tremuloides Michx.) as related to soil mapping units in northern Minnesota". Soil Science Society of America Journal, 43: 1189-1192
ESU, I. E.1983. "Characteristics and classification of the dark clay soils of Biu Plains, Nigeria". Nigerian Journal of Soil Science, 4:80-91.
ESU, I. E. and A.G. OJANUGA, 1985. "Morphological, physical and chemical characteristics of Alfisols in the Kaduna area of Nigeria". Samaru Journal of Agricultural Research 3(1&2):39-49
ESU, I. E. 1986. "Morphology and classification of soils of the Nupe sandstone formation in Niger state, Nigeria". Samaru Journal of Agricultural Research, 4(1&2):13-23
ESU, I. E. 1989. "A pedological characterization of soils of the Hadejia alluvial complex in the semi-arid region of Nigeria". Pedologie, XXXIX-2, 171–190.
ESU, I. E. and Asiribo, O.E. 1990. "Micronutrient fertility of some Northern Nigeria Vertisols and associated management implications" in P.M Ann and C.R Elliot (ed) Vertisol management in Africa. IBCRAM Proc. No. 9:347-359
MOBERG, J.P., I.E. ESU, and W.B MALGWI. 1991. "Characteristics and constituents’ composition of harmattan dust falling in northern Nigeria". Geoderma, 48:73-81.
MOBERG, J.P. and I.E ESU 1991. "Characteristics and composition of Nigerian Savanna Soils" Geoderma, 48:113-129
MUNKHOLM, L.J., I.E ESU and J.P MOBERG. 1993. "Trace elements in some northern Nigerians soils". Communication in Soil Science and Plant Analysis 24(7&8):657-672.
ESU, I. E. and O.E ASIRIBO. 1993. "Soil-vegetation relationships in the Kano plains of northern Nigeria". Geo-Eco-Trop., 17(1-4): 121–135.
ESU, I. E. 1995. "Effects of earthworm (Hyperiodrilus africanus) pedoturbation on selected soil properties in the levees of the Cross River South eastern Nigeria". African soils (Special Edition), Vol, XXVIII:363-374.
RAJI, B.A., I.E ESU, V.O. CHUDE, J.J. OWONUBI and KPARMWANG.1996. "Properties, classification and management implications of soils of Illela sand dunes, northern Nigeria". Journal of Science, Food and Agriculture (Gt.Britain) 71:425-432
ESU, I. E. and J.P MOBERG. 1997. "Clay mineralogical composition of three vertisol pedons developed on different parent materials in North eastern Nigeria". Nigerian Journal of Soil Science, Vol.10
ESU, I.E., A.U. AKPAN-IDIOK and M.O. EYONG. 2008. "Characterization and Classification of Soils along a Typical Hill-slope in Afikpo Area of Ebonyi State, Nigeria". Nigeria Journal Soil and Env. Research. Vol 8:1-16
AKPAN-IDIOK, A.U and ESU, I. E. 2013. "Morphology and Classification of Soils under three Mangrove Types in the Cross River Estuary, Southeast Nigeria". Journal of Agriculture, Biotechnology and Ecology, 6(1), 15–25.
UDOH, B. T., ESU, I. E. IBIA, T.O., ONWEREMADU, EU., and UNYIENYIN, S.E. 2013. "Agricultural potential of the beach soils of the Niger-Delta, Nigeria, Nigeria". Malaysian Journal of Soil Science, 17:17-37.
ESU, I. E., AKPAN-IDIOK, A.U., P.I OTIGBO, E.E. AKI and K.I. OFEM. 2014. "Characterization and Classification of Soils in Okitipupa Local Government Area, Ondo State, Nigeria". International Journal of Soil Science, (9), 22-36
AKI, E.E., ESU, I. E. and A.U. AKPAN-IDIOK 2014. "Pedological Study of Soils Developed on Biotite-Hornblende-Gnesis in Akamkpa Local Government Area of Cross River State of Nigeria". International Journal of Agriculture Research, 9(4), 187-199

Papers Published in Refereed Conference Proceedings
OJANUGA, A.G and ESU, I. E. 1986. Mineralogy of soils of humid tropical South-western Nigeria. Transactions of the 13th International Congress of Soil Science. Hamburg, West Germany, Vol.IV:1468-1469.
LOMBIN, G. and ESU, I. E. . 1988. Characteristics and management problems of the vertisols in the Nigerian savanna. In Jutzi, S. C. et al. (eds.) Management of Vertisolsin Sub-Saharan Africa, ILCA, Addis Ababa, Ethiopia, pp. 293–307
ESU, I. E. and O.E. ASIRIBO. 1989. Micronutrient fertility of some northern Nigerian vertisols and associated management implications. In: P.M Ahn and C.R. Elliot (eds), Vertisol Management in Africa. IBSRAM Proceedings No. 9:347-359.
ESU, I. E. 2005. Soil Characterization and mapping for food security and sustainable environment in Nigeria. A keynote address. Proceeding of the Annual Conference of the Soil Science Society of Nigeria, 31:19-28
AKPAN-IDIOK A.U. ESU, I. E.  2012. Characteristics, Uses and Management of Potential Acid Sulfate Soils for Rice Production in Niger-Delta Region of Nigeria. Peter Osterholm, Markku Yli-Halla and Peter Eden (eds). Geological Survey of Finland, Guide 56. Presented at 7th International Sulfate Soil Conference in Vaasa, Finland).
OFEM, K. I and ESU, I. E. 2014. Pedological study of soils developed on schist in Biase Local Government Area, Cross River State, Nigeria. Proceedings of the 38th Annual Conference of the Soil Science of Nigeria (SSSN), Uyo, Akwa Ibom State. pp 122–134.

Monographs and Commissioned Technical and Research Reports 
ESU, I. E. 1983. Reconnaissance soil survey of Area NG III (Zungeru-Bida-Mokwa) Niger state, Nigeria. Soil Map of Nigeria Project, Federal Department of Agric. Land Resources, Kaduna. 80pp.
ESU, I. E. 1984. Reconnaissance soil survey of the northern part (Area GSI) of Gongola state. Soil Map of Nigeria Project, Federal Department of Agric. Land Resources, Kaduna, 76pp.
ESU, I. E. 1989. Semi-detailed soil/land capability survey of the Daberam (Darugawa) Irrigation project commissioned by Parkman Nigeria Limited Consulting Engineers, Kaduna, for the Katsina state Government of Nigeria. 106pp.
ESU, I. E. 1991. Detained soil survey of NIHORT FARM at Bunkure, Kano State, Nigeria. A consultancy study project commissioned by the National Horticultural Research Institute, Ibadan, Nigeria. 72pp.
ESU, I. E. 1991. Obudu Irrigation Project Feasibility Study (Final Reports) Annex I: Agricultural Soil Studies. A Consultancy study commissioned by the Cross River Basin Development Authority, Calabar, Nigeria. 54pp.
ESU, I. E., A.U. Akpan-Idiok, G. A. Ayolagha and M. Idoko. 2009. Soil Fertility Evaluation in Three Southern states (Cross River, Edo and Rivers). A Consultancy Project commissioned by the federal Ministry of Agriculture & Water Resources, Area 11, Garki, Abuja, Nigeria. 149pp.

References

External links
 "Science, tech inefficiency hampering Africa’s growth – Cross River deputy governor" today.ng 6 September 2019. Retrieved 9 August 2020.

1951 births
Living people
People from Cross River State
University of Minnesota College of Food, Agricultural and Natural Resource Sciences alumni
Academic staff of the University of Calabar
Vice-Chancellors of Nigerian universities